Kelch-like family member 2 is a protein that in humans is encoded by the KLHL2 gene.

References

Further reading 

 
 
 
 
 
 
 
 
 

Kelch proteins